Killoughey, officially Killoughy and historically "Killaghy" or "Killahy", is a townland and civil parish south-west of Tullamore in County Offaly, Ireland.

Before 1784 there were two distinct parishes of Killoughey and Ballyboy. The two parishes were united in 1784 and today form one parish of Kilcormac and Killoughy of the Diocese of Meath.

The two main villages in the Killoughy end of the parish are Blue Ball and Mountbolus.

References

External links
 Killoughey Parish - unofficial webpage (map of area)

Townlands of County Offaly
Civil parishes of County Offaly